Jeanne M. Marrazzo is an American infectious diseases specialist. She is the director of the University of Alabama School of Medicine Division of Infectious Diseases and focuses on prevention of HIV infection using biomedical interventions. Marrazzo is also a fellow of the American College of Physicians and Infectious Disease Society of America.

Early life
Growing up in Dunmore, Pennsylvania, Marrazzo chose to get into a career with medicine because her mother was a nurse and her role model. She earned her undergraduate degree in biology from Radcliffe College and her medical degree from Jefferson Medical College. Marrazzo later completed residency training and chief residency in internal medicine at Yale-New Haven Hospital.

Career
Marrazzo joined the faculty at the University of Washington School of Medicine in 1995. While there, she co-founded the Lesbian/Bisexual Women’s Health Study with nurse practitioner Kathleen Stine after noticing an unusual number of middle-aged women had abnormal Pap smears. The results of their findings secured them funding from the National Institute of Allergy and Infectious Diseases (NIAID) to investigate the prevalence and routes of transmission of various STDs among lesbian and bisexual women. This led to a co-authored study titled Pap Smear Screening and Prevalence of Genital Human Papillomavirus Infection in Women Who Have Sex with Women, which found that out of 300 women in the Seattle area, 13 percent tested positive for HPV and 4 percent had pre-cancerous changes on a Pap test. The following year, she was elected a Fellow of the American College of Physicians.

In 2005, Marrazzo co-authored a study with David N. Fredricks and Tina L. Fiedler titled Molecular Identification of Bacteria Associated With Bacterial Vaginosis, which focused on the causes of bacterial vaginosis. In 2008, Marrazzo was appointed a member of the Subspecialty Board on Infectious Disease by the American Board of Internal Medicine (ABIM), and four years later was named its chair. During this time, Marrazzo was elected a Fellow of the Infectious Disease Society of America and Bennett Lorber Visiting Professor at Temple University. From 2009 until 2012, Marrazzo conducted the VOICE (Vaginal and Oral Interventions to Control the Epidemic) Study through the Microbicide Trials Network. The study was a randomized, placebo-controlled trial which examined the effects  daily use of oral tenofovir disoproxil fumarate had on over 5,000 women from 15 sites in South Africa, Uganda and Zimbabwe. The final published paper failed to prove that oral pre-exposure prophylaxis (PrEP) or of a tenofovir-containing vaginal microbicide gel was effective in lowering the risk of HIV.

Considered an expert in the field of HIV prevention, Marrazzo was appointed a co-chair of an interdisciplinary panel of experts to create a guideline in achieving an AIDS-free generation. The guidelines, which were later published in the Journal of the American Medical Association,  integrated evidence-based behavioral interventions for people with HIV or at high risk for HIV infection. Her efforts in HIV prevention earned her the 2015 American Sexually Transmitted Diseases Association (ASTDA) Achievement Award and appointment to chair of the American Board of Internal Medicine Council.

In 2016, Marrazzo succeeded Edward W. Hook, III as director of the University of Alabama School of Medicine Division of Infectious Diseases. After stepping down as president of the International Society for STD Research, she was named to the Infectious Diseases Society of America board of directors. On October 23, 2019, she was named principal investigator of a three-year $3.5 million grant study from NIAID to test the effectiveness the Bexsero vaccine has on protecting vulnerable populations from gonorrhea. During the COVID-19 pandemic, Marrazzo studied whether blood clots could result in the spread of the virus through the human body.

References

External links

Living people
University of Alabama at Birmingham faculty
Radcliffe College alumni
Thomas Jefferson University alumni
University of Washington alumni
American microbiologists
Women microbiologists
20th-century American women scientists
21st-century American women scientists
HIV/AIDS researchers
People from Dunmore, Pennsylvania
Fellows of the Infectious Diseases Society of America
Fellows of the American College of Physicians
Year of birth missing (living people)
American women academics